Mauritania competed at the 2004 Summer Paralympics in Athens, Greece. The country's delegation consisted of a single competitor, Ezzouha Edidal. Edidal competed in one track and field athletics event and did not win a medal.

Athletics

Women's track

See also 
 Mauritania at the Paralympics
 Mauritania at the 2004 Summer Olympics

References

Nations at the 2004 Summer Paralympics
2004
Paralympics